Claude Criquielion (11 January 1957 – 18 February 2015) was a  Belgian professional road bicycle racer who raced between 1979 and 1990. In 1984, Criquielion became the world road race champion in Barcelona, Spain on a gruelling course.  He had five top-ten finishes in the Tour de France.

Criquielion was well placed to win a medal in the  1988 world road race championship in Belgium. However, he crashed in sight of the line when another competitor, Steve Bauer of Canada, clashed with him. The third rider, Maurizio Fondriest, went on to win. Bauer was disqualified and Criquielion sued Bauer for assault, asking for $1.5 million in damages in a case that lasted more than three years before the judge ruled in Bauer's favor.

At the national championship race in 1985, he tested positive for Pervitin, but received no repercussions. The head of the laboratory at Ghent University, which had administered the analysis, subsequently resigned his post in the Medical Commission of the Belgian Cycling Association (KBWB) in protest.

Criquielion was directeur sportif of the  team from 2000 to 2004. His son, Mathieu Criquielion, turned professional for the Landbouwkrediet-Colnago team in 2005; Claude Criquielion became the team's manager.

From 2006 until his death Criquielion was an alderman for the liberal MR in Lessines.

During the night of 15-16 February 2015, Criquielion suffered a cerebrovascular accident and he was hospitalized in critical condition. Criquelion died at 9:00 AM on 18 February 2015 in a hospital in Aalst.

Career achievements

Major results

1979
 1st  Escalada a Montjuïc
 1st  Setmana Catalana de Ciclisme
 1st Escalada a Montjuïc
 9th Overall Tour de France
1980
 Tirreno–Adriatico
1st Stage 4
 Critérium du Dauphiné Libéré
1st Stage 3b
 3rd Overall Vuelta a España
1981
 9th Overall Tour de France
1982
 1st Brabantse Pijl
 4th Liège–Bastogne–Liège
 5th Overall Paris–Nice
 9th Giro di Lombardia
1983
 1st Clásica de San Sebastián
 8th Tour du Haut Var
1984
 1st  Road race, UCI Road World Championships
 1st Grand Prix Eddy Merckx
 1st  Escalada a Montjuïc
 Tour de Luxembourg
 1st Stage 1
 1st Escalada a Montjuïc
 2nd G.P de Wallonie
 3rd Critérium des As
 7th Liège–Bastogne–Liège
 7th Giro di Lombardia
 9th Overall Tour de France
1985
 1st La Flèche Wallonne
 1st Polynormande
 2nd Road race
 2nd Liège–Bastogne–Liège
 2nd Kampioenschap van Vlaanderen
 3rd G.P de Wallonie
 3rd Critérium des As
 6th Tour of Flanders
 8th Amstel Gold Race
1986
 1st  Overall Tour de Romandie
1st  Mountains classification
1st Combined classification
 1st  Overall Midi Libre
 1st Grand Prix du Midi Libre
 1st Stage 2 and 4
 Points classification
 3rd La Flèche Wallonne
 3rd Super Prestige Pernod
 4th Liège–Bastogne–Liège
 5th Overall Tour de France
 8th Tour of Flanders
 9th Amstel Gold Race
1987
 1st Grand Prix José Samyn
 1st Tour of Flanders
 1st GP de Fayt-le-Franc
 Tour de Luxembourg
 1st Stage 4
 2nd La Flèche Wallonne
 3rd Liège–Bastogne–Liège
 3rd Super Prestige Pernod
 7th Giro di Lombardia
 10th Overall Paris–Nice
1988
 1st Critérium des As
 1st GP de Wallonie
 1st GP de Purnode
 1st Grand Prix du Midi Libre
 1st Stage 2
 2nd Tour du Vaucluse
 3rd Amstel Gold Race
 5th Gent–Wevelgem
 8th Züri–Metzgete
1989
 1st La Flèche Wallonne
 1st GP Michel Goffin à Huppaye
 2nd Amstel Gold Race
 5th E3 Prijs Vlaanderen
 7th Overall Giro d'Italia
1990
 1st  Road race, National Road Championships
 2nd Tour du Haut Var
 8th Tour of Flanders
 6th Giro di Lombardia
 9th Overall Tour de France
1991
 2nd Liège–Bastogne–Liège
 2nd La Flèche Wallonne
 7th Overall Paris–Nice
Source

Grand Tour general classification results timeline

References

External links 

Official Tour de France results for Claude Criquielion
Palmares on Cycling Base 

Belgian male cyclists
UCI Road World Champions (elite men)
Walloon sportspeople
1957 births
2015 deaths
People from Lessines
Cyclists from Hainaut (province)